Robertsons may refer to:

Robertson (disambiguation), the name
Robertson's, the preservatives brandname